Special Service Medal refers to a campaign or service medal awarded by several countries:

 Special Service Medal (Canada)
 Special Service Medal (South Vietnam)
 New Zealand Special Service Medal
 United Nations Special Service Medal
 Special Service Medal (India)